CMA CGM Fort Saint Louis is owned by the shipping company CMA CGM and sails under a French flag, with Marseilles as her home port.  A container carrier, she plies a regular route between France and the French West Indies.

General information 
Launched in June 2003 with three other sister-ships:
 CMA CGM Fort Saint Pierre
 CMA CGM Fort Sainte Marie
 CMA CGM Fort Saint Georges

Built in the Taiwanese shipyard CSBC Corporation, Taiwan.
Bureau Veritas is the classification society.

The complete loop is made in 28 days and her ports of call are Dunkirk, Rouen, Le Havre, Montoir-de-Bretagne, Pointe-à-Pitre and Fort-de-France.
The four vessels arrive at weekly intervals, which offers a regular supply of provisions from the French West Indies such as rum and bananas.

References 

Ships of France
2003 ships
Ships built in the Republic of China